14th Street may refer to several locations in the United States:

14th Street (Manhattan), New York City
14th Street Northwest and Southwest (Washington, D.C.)
Broad Street (Philadelphia)
14th Street Bridge (Potomac River)
14th Street (Hoboken)
14th Street Viaduct (Jersey City, New Jersey)
Fourteenth Street Bridge (Ohio River)

Transit 
New York City Subway stations:
14th Street (IRT Second Avenue Line) (demolished)
14th Street (IRT Third Avenue Line) (demolished)
14th Street (IRT Ninth Avenue Line) (demolished)
14th Street (IRT Sixth Avenue Line); (demolished)
14th Street–Eighth Avenue (New York City Subway), a station complex consisting of:
14th Street (IND Eighth Avenue Line); serving the 
Eighth Avenue (BMT Canarsie Line); the northern terminal of the 
14th Street/Sixth Avenue (New York City Subway), a station complex consisting of:
14th Street (IND Sixth Avenue Line); serving the 
14th Street (IRT Broadway–Seventh Avenue Line); serving the 
Sixth Avenue (BMT Canarsie Line); serving the 
14th Street–Union Square (New York City Subway), a station complex consisting of:
14th Street–Union Square (BMT Broadway Line); serving the 
14th Street–Union Square (IRT Lexington Avenue Line); serving the 
Union Square (BMT Canarsie Line); serving the 
14th Street (PATH station); serving the HOB-33, JSQ-33 and JSQ-33 (via HOB) trains

14th Street may also refer to:
"14th Street", a 2003 song by Rufus Wainwright on his album Want One
"14th Street", a song written by Emily Spray and more familiarly recorded by Laura Cantrell
Fourteenth Street Historic District, Washington, D.C.

See also
14th Avenue (disambiguation)
14th Street Bridge (disambiguation)